This is a list of international trips made by Mikhail Gorbachev as the eighth and last leader of the Soviet Union. In this role he was General Secretary of the Communist Party from 1985 until 1991 as well as Chairman of the Presidium of the Supreme Soviet from 1988 to 1989 and President of the Soviet Union from 1990 to 1991.

Summary of visits

1985

The following are the international trips made by Gorbachev in 1985:

1986

The following are the international trips made by Gorbachev in 1986:

1987
The following are the international trips made by Gorbachev in 1987:

1988

The following are the international trips made by Gorbachev in 1988:

1989
The following are the international trips made by Gorbachev in 1989:

1990
The following are the international trips made by Gorbachev in 1990:

1991
The following are the international trips made by Gorbachev in 1991:

Cancelled visits

See also
List of Soviet Union–United States summits
List of international presidential trips made by Vladimir Putin
List of international presidential trips made by Boris Yeltsin
List of international presidential trips made by Dmitry Medvedev

References

External links
Gorbaciov in Romania - Mapa Speciala - OMUL SI TIMPUL
A full TV report covering the Chinese visit on Vremya – 15 May 1989
Gorbachev visits East Berlin, 17 April 1986
Mikhail S. Gorbachev's official visit to the UK
Mikhail Gorbachev in Ireland 1989
Bush & Gorbachev Malta Summit 1989
Soviet Union visit Cuba (1989) Anthems
Soviet Union visit Bulgaria 1985 - Anthems
President Reagan's Remarks at Arrival Ceremony for Mikhail Gorbachev on 8 December 1987
Soviet President Arrival Ceremony

Mikhail Gorbachev
20th century-related lists
20th century in international relations
Gorbachev
Diplomatic visits from Russia
Gorbachev
Russia history-related lists
Foreign relations of the Soviet Union
Diplomatic visits by heads of state